"I Can't Help Myself" is a song by European-American pop group The Kelly Family. Written by Angelo Kelly, it was produced by Kathy Kelly and Paddy Kelly for their ninth studio album Almost Heaven (1996) and features lead vocals by Paddy and Angelo Kelly. The song was released as the album's lead single and became the band's second number one hit after "An Angel" (1994), reaching the top in the Czech Republic, Germany, the Netherlands, Norway, and Switzerland.

Track listings

Credits and personnel 
Credits adapted from the liner notes of Almost Heaven.

Songwriting – The Kelly Family
Production – Kathy Kelly, Paddy Kelly
Executive production – Dan Kelly, Mike Ungefehr
Engineering, mixing – Günther Kasper, Max Carola
Mixing assistance – Georgi Nedeltschev, Kathy Kelly, Paddy Kelly
Mastering – Dieter Wegner, Georgi Nedeltschev

Charts

Weekly charts

Year-end charts

Certifications

References

External links
 KellyFamily.de — official site

1996 singles
1996 songs
Dutch Top 40 number-one singles
The Kelly Family songs
Number-one singles in the Czech Republic
Number-one singles in Germany
Number-one singles in Norway
Number-one singles in Switzerland